The men's singles three-cushion billiards competition at the 2017 World Games took place from 26 to 30 July 2017 at the Wroclaw Congress Center in Wrocław, Poland.

Bracket

References

Three-cushion billiards - men's singles
Three-cushion billiards competitions